General elections were held in the Dominican Republic on 16 May 1947. For the first time since the 1924 elections (and the only time during the Trujillo's rule) there was more than one presidential candidate. However, the incumbent Rafael Trujillo remained in power after receiving 93% of the vote. His Dominican Party won every seat in the Congressional elections.

Results

References

Dominican Republic
1947 in the Dominican Republic
Elections in the Dominican Republic
Presidential elections in the Dominican Republic
Election and referendum articles with incomplete results
May 1947 events in North America